The Plymouth-Canton Community Schools (P-CCS) is a school district headquartered at E. J. McClendon Educational Center in Plymouth, Michigan. The district's boundary includes areas in Wayne County and Washtenaw County, including City of Plymouth, Plymouth Township, and parts of Canton Township, Salem Township, Superior Township, and Northville Township.

Schools

Designated areas of the district are assigned to various schools. Each elementary school and middle school has an attendance zone. Students are randomly assigned to high schools, regardless of their locations within the district.

Alternative education
  Starkweather Educational Center (Plymouth Township, formerly Fiegel Elementary School)
  Gallimore Elementary School (Canton Twp. TAG Magnet school)

High schools
The district's high schools are located in the Plymouth-Canton Educational Park (P-CEP) in Canton Township.
 Canton High School (Formerly Plymouth-Canton High School)
 Plymouth High School
 Salem High School (Formerly Plymouth-Salem High School)

Middle schools

 Discovery Middle School (Canton Township)
 East Middle School (Plymouth)
 Pioneer Middle School (Plymouth Township)
 West Middle School (Plymouth Township)
 Liberty Middle School (Canton Township)

Elementary schools

 Bentley Elementary School (Canton Township)
 Bird Elementary School (Plymouth Township)
 George Dodson Elementary School (Canton Township)
 Eriksson Elementary School (Canton Township)
 Farrand Elementary School (Plymouth Township)
 Mildred Field Elementary School (Canton Township)
 Hoben Elementary School (Canton Township)
 Hulsing Elementary School (Canton Township)
 Isbister Elementary School (Plymouth Township)
 Miller Elementary School (Canton Township)
 In July 1975 the school started a pilot year-round schooling program, allowing it to increase its student capacity by one third. The pilot was completed in August 1977.
 Smith Elementary School (Plymouth)
 Flossie B. Tonda Elementary School (Canton Township)
 Workman Elementary School (Canton Township)

Defunct schools
  Canton Center School (Canton Township) - Now the Canton Historical Society Museum.
  Cherry Hill School (Canton Township) - Now used for community events
  Hanford School (Former one room school house)
  Bartlett School (Former school house located on Canton Center near Hanford.   May not have ever been part of PCCS)
  Hough School (Canton Township) - Now a private residence.
  Sheldon School (Canton Township) - Now used for private offices.
  Lowell Middle School (Westland) - was leased from the Livonia Public Schools school district for several years.  Now Johnson Upper Elementary
  Fiegel Elementary School (Plymouth Township)  - Now used as Starkweather Alt.  High School.
  Starkweather Elementary School (Plymouth)
  Kinyon School (Former school house located on Joy Rd east of Ridge.  Shown on 1942 topo map.  May not have been part of PCCS)
  Allen School (Former school house located on Ann Arbor Trail near Powell.  Shown on 1936 topo map.  May not have been part of PCCS)
  Allen Elementary School - Closed in 2014
  Plymouth High School (original downtown location) Closed in 1970 and re-opened as Central middle school 1971,  operated as a middle school until June 2015,  The property was sold to the Malcolm's and the Plymouth Art and Recreation Complex (PARC) was formed, and now  uses the building for a community space in November 2018 the PARC in a joint effort with Plymouth Township and the city of Plymouth  attempted to get a millage passed to renovate and update the old Plymouth high school. The millage failed, leaving the fate of the old Plymouth high school up for debate. The Melcom‘s had originally donated the property to the community foundation, a nonprofit group which would have donated the property to the city and the township after the passing of the millage.  For the millage to pass it had to pass in the Township and the city; the millage did pass in the city but not in the Township. Eventually, in January 2019 the community foundation donated the property to PARC, which is now the owner of the old Plymouth high school, and works to raise money to repair and renovate the old historical building.
  Tanger Elementary School (Northville Township)
 Tanger Center (Plymouth Township)

References

External links

 Plymouth-Canton Community Schools

School districts in Michigan
Education in Wayne County, Michigan
Education in Washtenaw County, Michigan
Canton, Michigan